Churban may refer to:

The destruction of the First Temple during the Siege of Jerusalem (587 BC).
The destruction of the Second Temple during the Siege of Jerusalem (AD 70)
Churban Europa, a term for the Holocaust which uses the word for the destruction of the Second Temple
 An early version of Rhythmic CHR, a radio format